Munna Singh Chauhan is an Indian politician, five time MLA, three times in Uttarakhand and member of the Bharatiya Janata Party. Chauhan was a member of the Uttarakhand Legislative Assembly from the Vikasnagar constituency in Dehradun district.

References 

People from Dehradun district
Bharatiya Janata Party politicians from Uttarakhand
Uttarakhand MLAs 2022–2027
Living people
Uttarakhand MLAs 2017–2022
Year of birth missing (living people)